In baseball statistics, a putout (denoted by PO or fly out when appropriate) is given to a defensive player who records an out by tagging a runner with the ball when he is not touching a base, catching a batted or thrown ball and tagging a base to put out a batter or runner (a force out), catching a thrown ball and tagging a base to record an out on an appeal play, catching a third strike (a strikeout), catching a batted ball on the fly (a fly out), or being positioned closest to a runner called out for interference. An outfielder (OF) is a person playing in one of the three defensive positions in baseball farthest from the batter, who are identified as the left fielder (LF), the center fielder (CF), and the right fielder (RF). An outfielder's duty is to try to catch long-fly balls before they hit the ground or to quickly catch or retrieve and return to the infield any other balls entering the outfield. Outfielders normally play behind the six other members of the defense who play in or near the infield; unlike catchers and most infielders (excepting first basemen), who are virtually exclusively right-handed, outfielders can be either right- or left-handed. In the scoring system used to record defensive plays, the outfielders are assigned the numbers 7 (left field), 8 (center field), and 9 (right field).

The overwhelming majority of putouts recorded by outfielders, almost to exclusivity, result from catching fly balls. However, in extraordinary circumstances, an outfielder may record a putout by receiving a throw to force out or tag out a runner while covering a base if one or more infielders are out of position to retrieve an errant throw, or by tagging a runner stranded between bases in a rundown play; however, even in such circumstances, outfielders will more typically act as a backup to infielders than cover a base themselves. Historically, putout totals for outfielders rose after 1920 with the end of the dead-ball era; the same circumstances which had kept home run totals low, such as overused baseballs and legal adulterations including the spitball, had similarly hindered the type of power hitting which lent itself to long fly balls. But as strikeout totals have risen in baseball in recent decades, the frequency of other defensive outs including flyouts has declined; as a result, putout totals for outfielders have likewise declined. Through the 2022 season, all but eight of the top 76 single-season outfield putout totals were recorded between 1920 and 1988; only one of the top 498 totals was recorded before 1912.

Because game accounts and box scores often did not distinguish between the outfield positions, there has been some difficulty in determining precise defensive statistics prior to 1901; because of this, and because of the similarity in their roles, defensive statistics for the three positions are frequently combined. Because they are expected to cover more territory in the outfield than their counterparts on either side, often being the fastest player of the three, center fielders typically record the highest putout totals; due to the frequency of fly balls, center fielders typically record more putouts than other players, except for catchers and first basemen, who record higher totals due to the frequency of strikeouts and ground outs respectively. 6 of the top 7 career leaders in outfield putouts, and 14 of the top 18, were center fielders. Willie Mays is the all-time leader in career putouts as an outfielder with 7,095; he is the only outfielder to record more than 7,000 career putouts. Tris Speaker (6,788), Rickey Henderson (6,468), Max Carey (6,363), Ty Cobb (6,361), and Richie Ashburn (6,089) are the only other outfielders to record more than 6,000 career putouts. Andrew McCutchen, who had 3,656 putouts through the 2022 season to place him 110th all-time, is the leader among active players.

Key

List

Other Hall of Famers

References

External links

Major League Baseball statistics
Putouts as an outfielder